North Bimini Airport is a seaplane base in North Bimini on Bimini in The Bahamas.''

In 2016, Cape Air began scheduled service to North Bimini from South Florida to feed Resorts World Bimini's hotel operation.

Airlines and destinations

References

Airports in the Bahamas